Wysoka  is a village in the administrative district of Gmina Olesno, within Olesno County, Opole Voivodeship, in south-western Poland.

References

Wysoka